Scott M. Paxson (born February 3, 1983) is a former American football defensive tackle. He was signed by the Pittsburgh Steelers as an undrafted free agent in 2006. He won Super Bowl XLIII with the Steelers over Kurt Warner and the Arizona Cardinals. He played college football at Penn State. Paxson has also been a member of the Green Bay Packers, Cleveland Browns and Montreal Alouettes.

Early years
Paxson attended Roman Catholic High School in Philadelphia, Pennsylvania.

College career
Paxson was named All-Big Ten Conference following his senior season at Penn State University. He majored in crime, law and justice.

Professional career

First stint with Steelers
Paxson signed as an undrafted free agent with the Pittsburgh Steelers shortly after the 2006 NFL Draft, but was released during the preseason.

Green Bay Packers
Paxson spent several weeks with the Green Bay Packers during the 2006 regular season.

Second stint with Steelers
Paxson signed a future contract with the Steelers on January 8, 2007. He spent the 2007 season as a member of the Steelers' practice squad and renewed his contract on January 15, 2008.

On October 4, 2008, Paxson was promoted to the Steelers' active roster and made his first regular season NFL appearance that week versus Jacksonville. He was waived on October 18 when the team promoted offensive tackle Jeremy Parquet to the active roster. He was re-signed to the practice squad on October 21, and promoted to the active roster again on December 1.

He was waived on September 4, 2009.

Paxson was re-signed to a future contract on January 7, 2010.

Paxson was again released on September 3, 2010 to make room for the mandatory 53-man roster.

Cleveland Browns
On January 8, 2011, it was announced that Paxson had signed with the Cleveland Browns on a future/reserve contract.

Paxson played in all 16 games with the Cleveland Browns in 2011, recording 21 tackles (10 solo, 11 assists and 1 sack).

In 2012, Paxson was injured during a pre-season game and missed the entire year.

Montreal Alouettes
Paxson signed with the Montreal Alouetteson June 10, 2013.

He was released on June 21, but re-signed with the Alouettes on August 2.

Personal

Scott Paxon has Type I diabetes.

References

External links
Pittsburgh Steelers bio
Montreal Alouettes bio 

1983 births
Living people
American football defensive tackles
Canadian football defensive linemen
American players of Canadian football
Players of American football from Philadelphia
Players of Canadian football from Philadelphia
Penn State Nittany Lions football players
Pittsburgh Steelers players
Green Bay Packers players
Cleveland Browns players
Montreal Alouettes players